This is a list of Mexican saints, blesseds, venerables, and Servants of God, as recognized by the Roman Catholic Church. These people were born, died, or lived their religious life in the present territory of Mexico. Because of missionaries who spent greater or lesser amounts of time in Mexico en route to other mission lands, exact numbers of Mexican saints vary.

The Catholic Church has been present in what is now Mexico since the earliest years of the sixteenth century. As early as 1517, the expedition of Francisco Hernández de Córdoba brought Catholicism to the Yucatan, where the first diocese in continental North America would be erected in 1518. Mexico's first saint was canonized in 1862. Today, Mexico accounts for more saints and Blesseds than any other country in the Western Hemisphere.

Mexican saints
 Felipe las Casas Martínez (Felipe of Jesus) (1571–1597), Professed Priest of the Franciscan Friars Minor (Alcantarines); Martyr (Mexico City, Mexico Nagasaki, Japan)
Declared Venerable: N/A
Beatified: 14 September 1627 by Pope Urban VIII
Canonized: 8 June 1862 by Pope Pius IX
 José Maria de Yermo Parres (1851–1904), Priest of the Diocese of León; Founder of the Servants of the Sacred Heart of Jesus and of the Poor (Estado de México – Puebla, Mexico)
Declared Venerable: 7 September 1989
Beatified: 6 May 1990 by Pope John Paul II
Canonized: 21 May 2000 by Pope John Paul II
 María Natividad Venegas de la Torre (María of Jesus in the Blessed Sacrament) (1868–1959), Founder of the Daughters of the Sacred Heart of Jesus of Guadalajara (Jalisco, Mexico)
Declared Venerable: 13 May 1989
Beatified: 22 November 1992 by Pope John Paul II
Canonized: 21 May 2000 by Pope John Paul II
 Juan Diego Cuauhtlatoatzin (1474–1548), Married Layperson of the Archdiocese of Mexico City (Mexico City, Mexico)
Declared Venerable: 9 April 1990
Beatified: 6 May 1990 by Pope John Paul II
Canonized: 31 July 2002 by Pope John Paul II
 Rafael Guízar Valencia (1878–1938), Bishop of Veracruz (Michoacán de Ocampo – Mexico City, Mexico)
Declared Venerable: 27 November 1981
Beatified: 29 January 1995 by Pope John Paul II
Canonized: 15 October 2006 by Pope Benedict XVI
 Anastasia Guadalupe García Zavala (María Guadalupe) (1878–1963),  Cofounder of the Handmaids of Saint Margaret Mary and of the Poor (Jalisco, Mexico)
Declared Venerable: 1 July 2000
Beatified: 25 April 2004 by Pope John Paul II
Canonized: 12 May 2013 by Pope Francis
 José Sánchez del Río (1913–1928), Child of the Diocese of Zamora; Martyr (Michoacán de Ocampo, Mexico)
Declared Venerable: 22 June 2004
Beatified: 20 November 2005 by Cardinal José Saraiva Martins, C.M.F.
Canonized: 16 October 2016 by Pope Francis
 Cristobal, Antonio and Juan (d. 1527–29), Children of the Diocese of Tlaxcala; Martyrs (Tlaxcala, Mexico)
Declared Venerable: 3 March 1990
Beatified: 6 May 1990 by Pope John Paul II
Canonized: 15 October 2017 by Pope Francis

Mexican blesseds
 Sebastián de Aparicio Prado (1502–1600), Professed Religious of the Franciscan Friars Minor (Orense, Spain – Puebla, Mexico)
Declared "Venerable": May 2, 1768
Beatified: May 17, 1789 by Pope Pius VI
 Miguel Agustín Pro Juárez (1891–1927), Professed Priest of the Jesuits; Martyr (Zacatecas – Mexico City, Mexico) 
Declared "Venerable": November 10, 1986
Beatified: September 25, 1988 by Pope John Paul II
 Mateo Elías Nieves Castillo (1882–1928), Professed Priest of the Augustinians; Martyr (Guanajuato, Mexico)
Declared "Venerable": December 17, 1996
Beatified: October 12, 1997 by Pope John Paul II
 Vicenta Chávez Orozco (María Vicenta of Saint Dorothy) (1867–1949), Founder of the Servants of the Holy Trinity and the Poor (Michoacán de Ocampo – Jalisco, Mexico)
Declared "Venerable": December 21, 1991
Beatified: November 9, 1997 by Pope John Paul II
 Martyrs of Cajonos
Juan Bautista (ca.1660–1700), Married Layperson of the Diocese of Antequera-Oaxaca; Martyr (Oaxaca, Mexico)
Jacinto de los Ángeles (ca. 1660–1700), Married Layperson of the Diocese of Antequera-Oaxaca; Martyr (Oaxaca, Mexico)
Declared "Venerable": July 7, 2001
Beatified: August 1, 2002 by Pope John Paul II
 Darío Acosta Zurita (1908–1931), Priest of the Diocese of Veracruz; Martyr (Veracruz, Mexico)
Declared "Venerable": June 22, 2004
Beatified: November 20, 2005 by Cardinal José Saraiva Martins, C.M.F.
 Juan de Palafox y Mendoza (1600–1659), Bishop of Puebla de los Ángeles and Osma (Navarra – Osma, Spain)
Declared "Venerable": January 17, 2009
Beatified: June 5, 2011 by Cardinal Angelo Amato, S.D.B.
 Manuela de Jesús Arias Espinosa (María Inés Teresa of the Blessed Sacrament) (1904–1981), Founder of the Poor Clare Missionary Sisters of the Blessed Sacrament and the Missionaries of Christ for the Universal Church (Nayarit, Mexico – Rome, Italy)
Declared "Venerable": April 3, 2009
Beatified: April 21, 2012 by Cardinal Angelo Amato, S.D.B.
 María Concepcíon Cabrera Arias de Armida (1862–1937), Married Laywoman of the Archdiocese of Mexico; Founder of the Apostolate of the Cross and the Religious of the Cross of the Sacred Heart of Jesus; Cofounder of the Missionaries of the Holy Spirit (San Luis Potosí – Mexico City, Mexico)
Declared "Venerable":  December 20, 1999
Beatified: May 4, 2019 by Cardinal Giovanni Angelo Becciu

Mexican venerables
 Antonio Margil Ros (Antonio of Jesus) (1657–1726), Professed Priest of the Franciscan Friars Minor (Valencia, Spain – Mexico City, Mexico)
Declared "Venerable": 31 July 1836
 Leonardo Castellanos y Castellanos (1862–1912), Bishop of Tabasco (Michoacán de Ocampo – Tabasco, Mexico) 
Declared "Venerable": 21 December 1989
 José Ramón Ibarra González (1853–1917), Archbishop of Puebla de los Ángeles (Guerrero – Mexico City, Mexico)
Declared "Venerable": 9 April 1990
 Dolores Medina Zepeda (María Dolores of the Wound on the Side of Christ) (1860–1925), Founder of the Daughters of the Passion of Jesus Christ and the Sorrows of Mary (Mexico City – Mexíco Distrito Federál, Mexico)
Declared "Venerable": 3 July 1998
 Pablo de Anda Padilla (1830–1904), Priest of the Diocese of León; Founder of the Minim Daughters of Mary Immaculate (Jalisco – Guanajuato, Mexico)
Declared "Venerable": 28 June 1999
 María Luisa de la Peña Navarro de Rojas (María Luisa Josefa [Luisita] of the Most Blessed Sacrament) (1866–1937), Widow; Founder of the Carmelite Sisters of the Sacred Heart of Guadalajara and the Carmelite Sisters of the Sacred Heart of Los Angeles (Jalisco, Mexico)
Declared "Venerable": 1 July 2000
 Benôit-Félix Rougier Olanier (1859–1938), Priest and Founder of the Missionaries of the Holy Spirit; Founder of the Guadalupan Missionary Sisters of the Holy Spirit and the Oblate Sisters of Jesus the Priest; Cofounder of the Daughters of the Holy Spirit (Puy-de-Dôme, France – Mexico City, Mexico)
Declared "Venerable": 1 July 2000
 Librada Orozco Santa Cruz (María Librada of the Sacred Heart of Jesus) (1834–1926), Founder of the Franciscan Sisters of Our Lady of Refuge (Jalisco, Mexico)
Declared "Venerable": 18 December 2000
 Julia Navarrete Guerrero (Julia of the Thorns of the Sacred Heart) (1881–1974), Founder of the Missionary Daughters of the Most Pure Virgin Mary (Oaxaca – Estado de Mexíco, Mexico)
Declared "Venerable": 22 June 2004
 Moisés Lira Serafin (1893–1950), Professed Priest of the Missionaries of the Holy Spirit; Founder of the Missionaries of Charity of Mary Immaculate (Puebla – Mexico City, Mexico)
Declared "Venerable": 27 March 2013
 Jean Prosper Fromental (Bernardo Felipe) (1895–1978), Professed Religious of the Brothers of the Christian Schools (De La Salle Brothers); Founder of the Guadalupan Sisters of De La Salle (Lozère, France – Mexico City, Mexico)
Declared "Venerable": 5 July 2013
 Jesús María Echavarría Aguirre (1858–1954), Bishop of Saltillo; Founder of the Institute of Sisters Catechists of Guadalupe (Guadalupan Catechist Sisters) (Sinaloa – Coahuila, Mexico) 
Declared "Venerable": 7 February 2014
 Agustín Ramírez Barba (1881–1967), Priest of the Diocese of San Juan de los Lagos; Founder of the Servants of the Lord of Mercy (Jalisco, Mexico)
Declared "Venerable": 16 July 2015
 María de Jesús Guízar Barragán (María of the Merciful Love of Jesus) (1899–1973), Founder of the Guadalupan Handmaids of Christ the Priest (Michoacán – Estado de Mexíco, Mexico) 
Declared "Venerable": 14 June 2016
 José Bardomiano de Jesús Guzmán Figueroa (Pablo María) (1897–1967), Professed Priest of the Missionaries of the Holy Spirit; Founder of the Eucharistic Missionaries of the Most Holy Trinity (Guanajuato – Mexico City, Mexico)
Declared "Venerable": 14 June 2016
 María Patricia Magdalena Pátlan Sánchez (Humilde of the Child Jesus) (1895–1970), Professed Religious of the Franciscan Sisters of the Immaculate Conception (Guanajuato, Mexico – Veracruz, Mexico)
Declared "Venerable": 16 June 2017
 Eusebio Francisco Kino (1645–1711), Professed Priest of the Jesuits (Trent, Italy – Sonora, Mexico)
Declared "Venerable": 10 July 2020
 Vasco de Quiroga (1470–1565), Bishop of Michoacán (Ávila, Spain Michoacán, Mexico)
Declared "Venerable": 21 December 2020

Mexican Servants of God
 Bartolomé de las Casas (1484–1566), Professed Priest of the Dominicans; Bishop of Chiapas (Seville – Madrid, Spain)
 Juan Bautista de Moya Valenzuela (1504–1567), Professed Priest of the Augustinians (Jaén, Spain – Michoacán, Mexico)
 Juana Inés de Asbaje Ramírez de Santillana (Juana Inés of the Cross) (1648–1695), Professed Religious of the Hieronymite Nuns (Estado de México –  Mexico City, Mexico)
 Luis Felipe Neri de Alfaro Velásquez (1709–1776), Priest of the Oratorians (Mexico City – Guanajuato, Mexico)
 Antonio Alcalde Barriga (1701–1792), Professed Priest of the Dominicans; Bishop of Guadalajara (Valladolid, Spain – Jalisco, Mexico)
 Cesárea Ruiz de Esparza Dávalos (1829–1884), Founder of the Sisters of Saint Joseph of Mexico (Josephite Sisters) (Aguascalientes, Mexico – Mexico City, Mexico)
 José Antonio Plancarte Labastida (1840–1898), Priest of the Archdiocese of Mexico; Founder of the Daughters of Mary Immaculate of Guadalupe (Mexico City, Mexico)
 José Anastasio Díaz López (1858–1905), Priest of the Diocese of Zacatecas; Founder of the Daughters of the Sacred Heart of Jesus and Our Lady of Guadalupe (Aguascalientes, Mexico – Zacatecas, Mexico)
 Miguel Cano Gutiérrez (1866–1924), Priest of the Archdiocese of Guadalajara; Founder of the Servants of the Holy Trinity and the Poor (Jalisco, Mexico)
 Eugenio Oláez Anda (1860–1933), Priest of the Diocese of León; Founder of the Daughters of the Sacred Heart of Jesus (Guanajuato, Mexico)
 María de la Luz Elisa Berruecos Juvera (María Elisa Margarita of the Holy Spirit) (1874–1944), Founder of the Sisters of the Sacred Heart of Jesus (Querétaro – Mexico City, Mexico)
 María Eugenia González Lafón (María Eugenia of the Holy Trinity) (1876–1962), Founder of the Catechist Sisters of Mary Most Holy, Order of Saint Benedict (Chihuahua – Querétaro, Mexico)
 Alfonso Pérez Larios (1886–1965), Professed Religious of the Missionaries of the Holy Spirit (Jalisco – Mexico City, Mexico)
 María Dolores Echevarría Esparza (1893–1966), Cofounder of the Missionaries of Jesus the Priest (Jalisco – Mexico City, Mexico)
 Gloria Esperanza Elizondo García (Gloría Maria of Jesus) (1908–1966), Professed Religious of the Catechist Sisters of the Poor (Durango – Nueva León, Mexico)
 María Regina Sánchez Muñoz (1895–1967), Founder of the Missionaries of the Sacred Heart of Jesus and Our Lady of Guadalupe (Guadalajara – Chihuahua, Mexico)
 José Soledad de Jesús Torres Castañeda (1918–1967), Bishop of Ciudad Obregón; Martyr (Zacatecas – Durango, Mexico)
 Roberto Cuellar García (1896–1970), Professed Priest of the Jesuits (Durango – Jalisco, Mexico)
 Antonio Hernández Gallegos (1912–1973), Bishop of Tabasco (Zacatecas – San Luis Potosí, Mexico)
 Rebeca María de Uriarte Healy (María Auxilia of the Cross) (1891–1974), Founder of the Oblate Sisters of the Blessed Sacrament (Puebla – Mexico City, Mexico)
 Martha Christlieb Ibarrola (1914–1975), Cofounder of the Sisters of the True Cross, Daughters of the Church (Mexico City – Veracruz, Mexico)
 Juan Pablo Góngora Alvarado (1894–1986), Priest of the Archdiocese of Yucatán; Founder of the Missionary Daughters of the Holy Mother of Light (Yucatán, Mexico)
 María Concepcíon Álvarez Icaza (María Angélica) (1887–1977), Professed Religious of the Visitation Nuns (Mexico City, Mexico)
 Maura Degollado Guízar de Maciel (1895–1977), Married Layperson of the Diocese of Tlalnepantla (Michoacán de Ocampo – Mexico City, Mexico)
 Juan María Navarrete Guerrero (1886–1982), Archbishop of Hermosillo (Oaxaca – Sonora, Mexico)
 José Abraham Martínez Betancourt (1903–1982), Bishop of Tacámbaro; Founder of the Servants of the Immaculate Conception (Michoacán, Mexico)
 Carlos Rosado Contraros (1926–1984), Priest of the Archdiocese of Yucatán (Yucatán, Mexico)
 José Ochoa Gutierrez (1909–1984), Priest of the Diocese of Zamora; Founder of the Missionaries of the Holy Family and the Parochial Workers of the Holy Family (Michoacán de Ocampo, Mexico)
 Vincenzo Idà (1909–1984), Priest of the Diocese of Oppido Mamertina-Palmi; Founder of the Missionary Sisters of the Catechism and the Missionaries of Evangelization (Vibo Valentia, Italy – Oaxaca, Mexico)
 Ana María Gómez Campos (Ana María of the Holy Spirit) (1894–1985), Cofounder of the Daughters of the Holy Spirit (Mexico City, Mexico)
 María Cristina Olimpia Macotela Durán (Margarita María) (1933–1985), Professed Religious of the Capuchin Poor Clares of the Blessed Sacrament (Mexico City – Puebla, Mexico)
 José del Pilar Quezada Valdés (1900–1985), Bishop of Acapulco (Jalisco, Mexico)
 Virginia Padilla Jiménez (1901–1986), Founder of the Missionary Sisters of Our Lady of Sorrows, Reparatrices of Her Sorrows (Jalisco – Mexico City, Mexico)
 Marina Francisca Cinta Sarrelangue de Balmori (1909–1988), Married Layperson of the Diocese of Coatzacoalcos (Veracruz – Mexico City, Mexico)
 María del Carmen López Guzmán (María Yolanda of Our Lady of Guadalupe) (1942–1991), Professed Religious of the Servants of the Holy Trinity and the Poor (Jalisco, Mexico)
 Federico de Aguinaga López (1904–1995), Layperson of the Archdiocese of Guadalajara (Jalisco, Mexico)
 Saturnino García Lara (1903–1995), Priest of the Archdiocese of Morelia (Guanajuato – Michoacán, Mexico)
 Basilio Rueda Guzmán (1924–1996), Professed Religious of the Marist Brothers of the Schools (Jalisco, Mexico)
 Salvador Rivera García (Salvador of the Immaculate Heart of Mary) (1934–1997), Professed Priest of the Discalced Carmelites (Guanajuato – Jalisco, Mexico)
 Antonietta Böhm Schwanewilm (1907–2008), Professed Religious of the Daughters of Mary, Help of Christians (Salesian Sisters) (Bottrop, Germany – Estado de Mexíco, Mexico)
 Adalberto Almeida Merino (1916–2008), Archbishop of Chihuáhua (Chihuáhua, Mexico)
 Ramón Sáinz Orozco (1882-1937), Married Layperson of the Diocese of San Juan de los Lagos; Martyr
 Martín Lawers González (1881–1933), Priest of the Diocese of Irapuato; Martyr

Group Martyrs
 Martyrs of Tepehuanes (Durango, Mexico):
Fernando de Tobar (1581–1616), Professed Priest of the Jesuits; Martyr (Sinaloa, Mexico)
Bernardo de Cisneros (1582–1616), Professed Priest of the Jesuits; Martyr (Palencia, Spain)
Diego de Orozco (1588–1616), Professed Priest of the Jesuits; Martyr (Cáceres, Spain)
Juan del Valle (1575–1616), Professed Priest of the Jesuits; Martyr (Vizcaya, Spain)
Luis de Alavés (1589–1616), Professed Priest of the Jesuits; Martyr (Oaxaca, Mexico)
Juan Fonte (1574–1616), Professed Priest of the Jesuits; Martyr (Barcelona, Spain)
Jeronimo de Moranta (1574–1616), Professed Priest of the Jesuits; Martyr (Islas Baleares, Spain) 
Fernando de Santarén (1567–1616), Professed Priest of the Jesuits; Martyr (Cuenca, Spain)
 Martyrs of Japan:
 Ludovic Frarijn [Luis Flores] (c. 1563–1622), Professed Priest of the Dominicans (Antwerp, Belgium – Nagasaki, Japan)
 Pedro de Zúñiga (c. 1579–1622), Professed Priest of the Augustinians (Seville, Spain – Nagasaki, Japan)
 Pedro de Ávila (1591–1622), Professed Priest of the Franciscan Friars Minor (Alacartines) (Ávila, Spain – Nagasaki, Japan)
 Vicente Ramírez (Vicente of Saint Joseph) (1597–1622), Professed Priest of the Franciscan Friars Minor (Alacartines) (Huelva, Spain – Nagasaki, Japan)
 Bartolomé Díaz Laurel (1599–1627), Professed Religious of the Franciscan Friars Minor (Observants) (Guerrero, Mexico – Nagasaki, Japan)
 Bartolomé Gutiérrez Rodríguez (1580–1632), Professed Priest of the Augustinians (Mexico City, Mexico – Nagasaki, Japan)
 Luis Cabrera Sotelo (1574–1624), Professed Priest of the Franciscan Friars Minor (Observants) (Seville, Spain – Nagasaki, Japan)
 Declared "Venerable": February 26, 1866
 Beatified: May 7, 1867 by Pope Pius IX
 Martyrs during Mexican Revolution (d. 1916–1937)
 David Galván Bermúdez (1881–1915), Priest of the Archdiocese of Guadalajara (Jalisco, Mexico)
 Luis Batis Sáinz (1870–1926), Priest of the Diocese of Durango (Zacatecas, Mexico)
 Manuel Moralez (1898–1926) Married Layperson of the Diocese of Durango (Zacatecas, Mexico)
 Salvador Lara Puente (1905–1926), Young Layperson of the Diocese of Durango (Durango, Mexico Zacatecas, Mexico)
 David Roldán Lara (1902–1926), Young Layperson of the Diocese of Durango (Zacatecas, Mexico)
 Cristóbal Magallanes Jara (1869–1927), Priest of the Archdiocese of Guadalajara (Jalisco, Mexico)
 Román Adame Rosales (1859–1927), Priest of the Archdiocese of Guadalajara (Jalisco, Mexico)
 Rodrigo Aguilar Alemán (1875–1927), Priest of the Archdiocese of Guadalajara (Jalisco, Mexico)
 Julio Álvarez Mendoza (1866–1927), Priest of the Archdiocese of Guadalajara (Jalisco, Mexico)
 Agustín Caloca Cortés (1898–1927), Priest of the Archdiocese of Guadalajara (Zacatecas, Mexico Jalisco, Mexico)
 Mateo Correa Magallanes (1866–1927), Priest of the Diocese of Durango (Zacatecas, Mexico Durango, Mexico)
 José María Robles Hurtado (1888–1927), Priest of the Archdiocese of Guadalajara; Founder of the Hermanas del Corazon of Jesús Sacramentado (Jalisco, Mexico)
 Jenaro Sánchez Delgadillo (1886–1927), Priest of the Archdiocese of Guadalajara (Jalisco, Mexico)
 Miguel de la Mora y de la Mora (1878–1927), Priest of the Diocese of Colima (Jalisco, Mexico Colima, Mexico)
 Pedro Esqueda Ramírez (1887–1927), Priest of the Archdiocese of Guadalajara (Jalisco, Mexico)
 David Uribe Velasco (1889–1927), Priest of the Diocese of Chilpancingo (Guerrero, Mexico Morelia, Mexico)
 Sabas Reyes Salazar (1883–1927), Priest of the Archdiocese of Guadalajara (Jalisco, Mexico)
 Margarito Flores García (1899–1927), Priest of the Diocese of Chilpancingo (Guerrero, Mexico)
 José Isabel Flores Varela (1866–1927), Priest of the Archdiocese of Guadalajara (Zacatecas, Mexico Jalisco, Mexico)
 Atilano Cruz Alvarado (1901–1928), Priest of the Archdiocese of Guadalajara (Jalisco, Mexico)
 Jesús Méndez Montoya (1880–1928), Priest of the Diocese of Morelia (Michoacán, Mexico Guanajuato, Mexico)
 Justino Orona Madrigal (1877–1928), Priest of the Archdiocese of Guadalajara; Founder of the Hermanas Clarisas del Sagrado Corazon (Jalisco, Mexico)
 Toribio Romo González (1900–1928), Priest of the Archdiocese of Guadalajara (Jalisco, Mexico)
 Tranquilino Ubiarco Robles (1899–1928), Priest of the Archdiocese of Guadalajara (Jalisco, Mexico)
 Pedro de Jesús Maldonado Lucero (1892–1937), Priest of the Archdiocese of Chihuáhua (Chihuáhua, Mexico)
Declared Venerable: 7 March 1992
Beatified: 22 November 1992 by Pope John Paul II
Canonized: 21 May 2000 by Pope John Paul II
 Martyrs of the Spanish Civil War:
 José Pascual Carda Saporta (1893–1936), Priest of the Diocesan Laborer Priests of the Sacred Heart of Jesus (Castellón, Spain)*
 Isidoro Bover Oliver (1890–1936), Priest of the Diocesan Laborer Priests of the Sacred Heart of Jesus (Castellón, Spain)*
 Dionisio Pamplona Polo (Dionisio of Saint Barbara) (1868–1936), Professed Priest of the Piarists (Teruel – Huesca, Spain)**
 Declared "Venerable": July 6, 1993*; December 15, 1994**
 Beatified: October 1, 1995 by Pope John Paul II
 Gabriel Escoto Ruiz (José María) (1878–1936), Novice of the Carmelites of the Ancient Observance (Jalisco, Mexico – Lleida, Spain)*
 Luciano Hernández Ramírez (Reginaldo) (1909–1936), Professed Priest of the Dominicans (Jalisco, Mexico – Madrid, Spain)*
 Declared "Venerable": June 26, 2006*
 Beatified: October 28, 2007 by Cardinal José Saraiva Martins, C.M.F.
 Martyrs of San Joaquin:
 José Trinidad Rangél Montaño (1887–1927), Priest of the Archdiocese of León (Guanajuato Jalisco, Mexico)
 Antonio Pérez Lários (1883–1927), Layperson of the Archdiocese of León (Jalisco, Mexico)
 Andrés Solá Molist (1895–1927), Professed Priest of the Claretians (Barcelona, Spain Jalisco, Mexico)
Declared "Venerable": June 22, 2004
Beatified: November 20, 2005 by Cardinal José Saraiva Martins, C.M.F.
 Martyrs of Guadalajara:
 Anacleto González Flores (1888–1927), Married Layperson of the Archdiocese of Guadalajara (Jalisco, Mexico)
 José Dionisio Luis Padilla Gómez (1899–1927), Layperson of the Archdiocese of Guadalajara (Jalisco, Mexico)
 Jorge Ramon Vargas González (1899–1927), Layperson of the Archdiocese of Guadalajara (Jalisco, Mexico)
 Ramón Vicente Vargas González (1905–1927), Layperson of the Archdiocese of Guadalajara (Jalisco, Mexico)
 José Luciano Ezequiel Huerta Gutiérrez (1876–1927), Married Layperson of the Archdiocese of Guadalajara (Jalisco, Mexico)
 Salvador Huerta Gutiérrez (1880–1927), Married Layperson of the Archdiocese of Guadalajara (Jalisco, Mexico)
 Miguel Gómez Loza (1808–1928), Married Layperson of the Archdiocese of Guadalajara (Jalisco, Mexico)
 Luis Magaña Servín (1902–1928), Married Layperson of the Archdiocese of Guadalajara (Jalisco, Mexico)
Declared "Venerable": June 22, 2004
Beatified: November 20, 2005 by Cardinal José Saraiva Martins, C.M.F.
 Martyrs of the Mexican Republic:
 Inocencio López Velarde Morán (1860–1914), Priest of the Diocese of Zacatecas (Jalisco – Zacatecas, Mexico)
 Pascual Vega Alvarado (1851–1914), Priest of the Diocese of Zacatecas (Zacatecas, Mexico)
 Charles-Alphonse Astruc (Adrian María) (1860–1914), Professed Religious of the Brothers of the Christian Schools (De La Salle Brothers) (Lozère, France – Zacatecas, Mexico)
 Jean-François-Théophile Gilles (Adolfo Francisco) (1869–1914), Professed Religious of the Brothers of the Christian Schools (De La Salle Brothers) (Lozère, France – Zacatecas, Mexico)
 Mariano Bermúdez González (1888–1914), Professed Religious of the Claretians (Zacatecas, Mexico)
 Miguel Pérez Rubio (1863–1914), Priest of the Archdiocese of Guadalajara (Jalisco, Mexico)
 Andrés Avelino Flores Quesney (1880–1915), Priest of the Diocese of Ciudad Obregon (Sonora, Mexico)
 Crescenciano Aguilar Zúñiga (1877–1925), Priest of the Archdiocese of Guadalajara (Jalisco – Zacatecas, Mexico)
 José García Farfán (1877–1926), Married Layperson of the Archdiocese of Puebla (Tlaxcala – Puebla, Mexico)
 Joaquín de Silva Carrasco (1898–1926), Young Layperson of the Archdiocese of Mexico City (Guanajuato – Michoacán, Mexico)
 Manuel Melgarejo Nápoles (1908–1926), Young Layperson of the Archdiocese of Mexico City (Mexico City – Michoacán, Mexico)
 José Vargas Reyes (d. 1926), Layperson of the Archdiocese of Morelia (Michoacán, Mexico)
 José Natividad Herrero Delgado (1911–1926), Child of the Diocese of San Juan de los Lagos (Jalisco, Mexico)
 Juan Manuel Bonilla Manzano (1904–1927), Young Layperson of the Archdiocese of Mexico City (Mexico City – Estado de México, Mexico)
 Florentino Alvarez Medina (1890–1927), Married Layperson of the Archdiocese of León (Guanajuato, Mexico)
 Tomás de la Mora (1909–1927), Priest of the Diocese of Colima (Colima, Mexico)
 Pablo García Fernández (1876–1927), Priest of the Archdiocese of Guadalajara (Jalisco, Mexico)
 María del Carmen Robles Ibarra (1890–1928), Layperson of the Diocese of Zacatecas (Zacatecas – Jalisco, Mexico)
 Antonio Méndez Padrón (1887–1928), Priest of the Archdiocese of San Luis Potosí (San Luis Potosí, Mexico)
 Emilio Pérez Michel (1876–1928), Priest of the Diocese of Autlán (Jalisco, Mexico)
 Salvador Gutiérrez de Mora (1904–1928), Layperson of the Archdiocese of Mexico City (Mexico City – Guerrero, Mexico)
 José de Jesús Mora Salado (1886–1928), Priest of the Diocese of Ciudad Guzmán (Michoacán, Mexico)
 Ramón Parada López (1896–1928), Married Layperson of the Archdiocese of Guadalajara (Jalisco, Mexico)
 Zenaida Llerenas Torres (1913–1928), Young Layperson of the Diocese of Colima (Colima, Mexico)
 David Maduro Vertiz (1885–1929), Professed Priest of the Jesuits (Estado de México – Coahuila, Mexico)
 Gabriel Ángel García Morales (1906–1930), Young Layperson of the Diocese of Tabasco (Tabasco – Chiapas, Mexico)
 Francisco Marmolejo (1895–1931), Married Layperson of the Diocese of Aguascalientes (Jalisco, Mexico)
 Adolfo Mota Pineda (1885–1932), Priest of the Diocese of Colima (Colima – Jalisco, Mexico)
 Leonor Sánchez López (1918–1937), Young Layperson of the Diocese of Orizaba (Veracruz, Mexico)

Mexican candidates for sainthood
 Martín de Valencia (1474–1534), Professed Priest of the Franciscan Friars Minor (Valencia de Don Juan, Spain – Tlalmanalco, Mexico)
 Juan de Zumárraga (1468–1548), Professed Priest of the Franciscan Friars Minor; Bishop of Mexico City (Biscay, Spain – Mexico City, Mexico)
 Gregorio López (1542–1596), Layperson of the Archdiocese of Mexico City; Hermit (Madrid, Spain – Mexico City, Mexico)
 Pedro de Agurto (1544–1608), Professed Priest of the Augustinians; Bishop of Cebu (Mexico City, Mexico – Cebu, Philippines)
 Diego Bazan (d. 1672), Layperson of the Archdiocese of Mexico City; Martyr (Mexico – Tumon, Guam)
 Francisco Hermenegildo Tomás Garcés (1738–1781), Professed Priest of the Franciscan Friars Minor (Zaragoza, Spain – Sonora, Mexico)
 Luigi Corsini (1928–1963), Professed Priest of the Comboni Missionaries of the Heart of Jesus; Martyr (Brescia, Italy – Baja California Sur, Mexico)
 Rodolfo Aguilar Álvarez (1948–1977), Priest of the Archdiocese of Chihuahua (Mexico City, Mexico – Chihuahua, Mexico)
 Juan Morán Samaniego (1943–1979), Priest of the Diocese of Altacomulco; Martyr (Estado de México, Mexico)
 María Concepción Zúñiga López (María Concepción of the Nativity and the Perpetual Help of Mary) (1914–1979), Founder of the Franciscan Minim Sisters of the Atonement of the Perpetual Help of Mary and the Franciscan Minim Friars of the Atonement of the Perpetual Help of Mary (Jalisco, Mexico – Jalisco, Mexico)
 Luz Marina Valencia Triviño (1952–1987), Professed Religious of the Missionaries of the Immaculate Conception (Cundinamarca, Colombia – Guerrero, Mexico)
 Carlos Abascal (1949–2008), Layperson of the Archdiocese of Mexico City (Mexico City)
 Juan Miguel Contreras García (1985–2018), Priest of the Archdiocese of Guadalajara; Martyr (Jalisco, Mexico)

See also
History of Roman Catholicism in Mexico
Roman Catholicism in Mexico
List of American saints and beatified people
List of Canadian Roman Catholic saints
List of Central American and Caribbean Saints
List of saints of the Canary Islands
List of Scandinavian saints

References

 
 
 
"Hagiography Circle"

 

Mexican
Z
Z

Saints
Saints